Antoine Audet (December 8, 1846 – June 14, 1915) was a Canadian politician and farmer. He was elected to the House of Commons of Canada in 1887 as a Member of the historical Conservative Party to represent the riding of Shefford. He did not stand for the next election.

In 1857, he married Louise Couture. Audet was postmaster for North Stukely in Shefford County.

References

External links

1846 births
1915 deaths
Conservative Party of Canada (1867–1942) MPs
Members of the House of Commons of Canada from Quebec
People from Boucherville
Canadian postmasters